Taro Yamamoto (October 29, 1919 – June 12, 1994) belonged to the New York School Abstract Expressionist artists whose artistic innovation by the 1950s had been recognized across the Atlantic, including Paris.

Biography
Yamamoto was born October 29, 1919, in Hollywood, California.  He lived in Japan from age six to age nineteen.  Yamamoto served in the U.S. Army during World War II, from November 7, 1941, to February 23, 1946.

Yamamoto studied:  1949 at the Santa Monica City College; 1950–1952 at The Art Students League of New York, under Yasuo Kuniyoshi, Morris Kantor, Byron Browne and Vaclav Vytlacil; 1951–1953 at the Hans Hofmann School of Fine Arts in New York City.

Yamamoto in 1952 won the John Sloan Memorial Fellowship at The Art Students League of New York. In 1953, under the Edward G. McDowell Traveling Fellowship went to Europe.

He married Gwynneth Cotton, a naturalized English woman, in 1955, and they lived in Wellfleet, Massachusetts. They were active at the Universalist Church of Provincetown.

Yamamoto died in Provincetown in 1994.

Selected solo exhibitions
1953: Gallerie Huit, Paris;
1955: The Art Students League of New York, NYC;
1960–1962: Krasner Gallery, NYC;
1963–1964: 371 Gallery, Provincetown, MA;

Selected group exhibitions
1951: Pennsylvania Academy of Fine Arts;
1952: NY Contemporary Gallery, NYC;
1952, 1955, 1956, 1962: Provincetown Art Association & Museum, Provincetown, MA;
1953: "New York Painting and Sculpture Annual," Stable Gallery, NYC;
1958: Riverside Museum, NYC;
1960: University of Minnesota and Dayton Art Institute;
1957, 1965: Guild Hall Museum, East Hampton, NY

See also
Action painting

References

Provincetown Art Association & Museum, New York--Provincetown, a 50s connection: July 8-August 1, 1994 Publisher: The Association and Museum, Provincetown, MA: 1994. OCLC: 193550963

Books
 Marika Herskovic, New York School Abstract Expressionists Artists Choice by Artists, (New York School Press, 2000.) . p. 33; p. 39; p. 378-381

External links for image reproduction
Taro Yamamoto paintings from artnet.com

1919 births
1994 deaths
People from Hollywood, Los Angeles
Abstract expressionist artists
20th-century American painters
American male painters
United States Army personnel of World War II
American military personnel of Japanese descent
Modern painters
American artists of Japanese descent
20th-century American male artists